Kuchek Khortum (also Romanized as Kūchek Khorţūm and Kūchak Khorţūm) is a village in Bagheli-ye Marama Rural District, in the Central District of Gonbad-e Qabus County, Golestan Province, Iran. At the 2006 census, its population was 1,076, in 235 families.

References 

Populated places in Gonbad-e Kavus County